The Gregg School is a non-selective independent secondary day school for boys and girls in Townhill Park, Southampton, Hampshire, UK, with an associated kindergarten and primary school, the Gregg Preparatory School, near Southampton Common.  The main school occupies Townhill Park House and its grounds. It was founded in Southampton in 1901 and has more than 300 pupils and staff. The Gregg School is not a fully academically selective school.  Selection is made through an entry assessment and references from the student's previous school.

History
The secondary school is the only surviving member in the UK of a commercial chain of schools in the British Isles and North America founded by John Robert Gregg, an Irish-born American, originally to teach his method of shorthand.

(A sister secondary school, the Gregg High School for Girls in Jesmond, Newcastle closed in the 1960s.)

It was founded in 1901 as a commercial school in the docklands of Southampton. In the 1920s it joined the Gregg chain and moved to Grosvenor Square in the Regency district of the city.

Over the next few decades the school expanded and broadened the range of subjects taught. It opened a secondary school to teach conventional academic subjects in Winn Road (which is now home to the Gregg Preparatory school, formerly St Winifred's).

It bought Townhill Park in 1994.

The school went into administrative receivership in 1995, but was restored to the register of companies in 1997. A charity,  The Gregg School and St Winifred School Trust, was founded in 1998 to run the school.

Sherilee Helen Sellers is the head. She was formerly deputy head, and a head girl of the school. Mrs Sellers succeeded the lateRoger Douglas Hart, who had been at the school for 39 years, when he retired.

Former pupils

The school's alumni include Millvina Dean, last survivor of the RMS Titanic, and Sally Matthews, British opera singer.

The school started an Alumni Association in 2009.

References

External links
School Website
Profile on the ISC website
ISI Inspection Report
Details of The Gregg and St Winifred’s Schools Trust on Companies House website

Educational institutions established in 1901
Private schools in Southampton
 
Member schools of the Independent Schools Association (UK)
1901 establishments in England